Bangkok School of Management (BSM) is an educational institution in Thailand, established in 1998, which offers courses in business and management. It is located on the 16th floor of the Amarin Plaza in the Ratchaprasong area of Bangkok.

Student and faculty 
Approximately 80% of the students and 70% of the faculty members come from an international background, positioning BSM as one of the only educational institutions in the region with an international approach to education. The students and staff come from a range of different countries, representing the continents of Europe, Asia, Australasia. All of the classes at BSM are conducted in English.

Curriculum 
The school operated initially as an American Degree programme provider in partnership with Southern New Hampshire University, USA. Due to natural evolution and academic demand, the institution had gradually evolved to be focusing more on the UK and European curriculum-based education and to fill a void within this academic space. As of current, BSM is the Official Learning Support Centre for Northumbria University, Newcastle UK, for the undergraduate programme,, European Global School-Paris (France) for the graduate and postgraduate programmes such as Bachelor of Arts in Education (BAEd), Master of Business Administration (MBA), Master of Arts in Education (MAEd), Master of Science in Mental Health Psychology (MSMHP) and Doctorate degrees:
 Doctor of Philosophy (Ph.D.)
 Doctor of Business Administration (D.B.A.)
 Doctor of Education (Ed.D.)
 Doctor of Psychology (Psych.D.)
 Doctor of Management (D.Man.)

Undergraduate programme
BSM offers a "2+1" undergraduate programme, providing students with the possibility of completing their first two years of undergraduate study in Bangkok, and the final year of their bachelor's degree either in Thailand itself or directly in the UK at Northumbria University's main campus in Newcastle.
There are two bachelor's degree programmes offered to students through this pathway:
1) BA (Hons) Leadership and Management
2) BSc (Hons) Business and Management

Under the undergraduate programme, Adult Pathway programme is created to help professionals who missed the boat in education. Only 5 years of working experience in business is needed to enrol to this programme. 
The duration of the study would be two years, instead of the normal duration of three years. The degree is awarded by Northumbria University, Newcastle.

1 Year Top-Up Programme 
This programme is suitable for those who have completed a higher diploma in BSM or other respectable institutions all over the world.
They can achieve a bachelor's degree in business in 12 months. The degree is awarded by Northumbria University, Newcastle.

Post Graduate Programme 
As the Official Support Centre for the European Global School - Paris, BSM launched the only internationally accredited European MBA programme in Thailand. This is a blended-learning mode programme, giving students the option to attend two class-discussions per module, complemented by private online study. There are a total of 8 modules to be completed + 1 action research paper (study period of between 12–18 months).
Upon graduation, students will receive an MBA degree from European Global School - Paris (EGS)

Other forms of education 
: BSM provides university preparedness tutorials, focused on areas such as business and academic English (IELTS, TOEFL, TOIEC), mathematics, and general one on hour tutorial support which can be customized to the needs of the student.

: Apart from the academic and student support programmes provided, BSM also offers training in the area of corporate development and personal development, with over 1000 people trained from a variety of different companies and fields within the ASEAN region.

References

External links

Business schools in Thailand
University departments in Thailand
Northumbria University